In quantum mechanics, a quantum Markov semigroup describes the dynamics in a Markovian open quantum system. The axiomatic definition of the prototype of quantum Markov semigroups was first introduced by A. M. Kossakowski in 1972, and then developed by V. Gorini, A. M. Kossakowski, E. C. G. Sudarshan and Göran Lindblad in 1976.

Motivation
An ideal quantum system is not realistic because it should be completely isolated while, in practice, it is influenced by the coupling to an environment, which typically has a large number of degrees of freedom (for example an atom interacting with the surrounding radiation field). A complete microscopic description of the degrees of freedom of the environment is typically too complicated. Hence, one looks for simpler descriptions of the dynamics of the open system. In principle, one should investigate the unitary dynamics of the total system, i.e. the system and the environment, to obtain information about the reduced system of interest by averaging the appropriate observables over the degrees of freedom of the environment. To model the dissipative effects due to the interaction with the environment, the Schrödinger equation is replaced by a suitable master equation, such as a Lindblad equation or a stochastic Schrödinger equation in which the infinite degrees of freedom of the environment are "synthesized" as a few quantum noises. Mathematically, time evolution in a Markovian open quantum system is no longer described by means of one-parameter groups of unitary maps, but one needs to introduce quantum Markov semigroups.

Definitions

Quantum dynamical semigroup (QDS)

In general, quantum dynamical semigroups can be defined on von Neumann algebras, so the dimensionality of the system could be infinite.
  is completely positive for all ,
It is worth mentioning that, under the condition of complete positivity, the operators  are -weakly continuous if and only if  are normal.

Quantum Markov semigroup (QMS)

A quantum dynamical semigroup  is said to be identity-preserving (or conservative, or Markovian) if

where  is the identity element. For simplicity,  is called quantum Markov semigroup. Notice that, the identity-preserving property and positivity of  imply  for all  and then  is a contraction semigroup.

The Condition plays an important role not only in the proof of uniqueness and unitarity of solution of a Hudson-Parthasarathy quantum stochastic differential equation, but also in deducing regularity conditions for paths of classical Markov processes in view of operator theory.

Infinitesimal generator of QDS
The infinitesimal generator of a quantum dynamical semigroup  is the operator  with domain , where

Characterization of generators of uniformly continuous QMSs

If the quantum Markov semigroup  is uniformly continuous in addition, which means , then 
 the infinitesimal generator  will be a bounded operator on von Neumann algebra  with domain ,
 the map  will automatically be continuous for every ,
 the infinitesimal generator  will be also -weakly continuous.

Under such assumption, the infinitesimal generator  has the characterization 

Moreover, above  denotes the commutator, and  the anti-commutator.

Selected recent publications

See also

References

Quantum mechanics
Semigroup theory